Mealsgate is a village in Cumbria, England, historically within Cumberland.

Location
Mealsgate  is situated on the old Roman Road between Carlisle and the Roman fort of Derventio at Papcastle . This road is now known as the A595. Mealsgate is situated on edge of the Lake District National Park.

Railway Connection
Mealsgate was a stop on the Bolton Loop of the Maryport and Carlisle Railway and served the pit at Fletchertown like other stops on the loop.

Governance
The village is in the parliamentary constituency of Workington, Mark Jenkinson is the Member of parliament.

For Local Government purposes it is in the Boltons Ward of Allerdale Borough Council. The village straddles the Aspatria Ward and  Thursby Ward of Cumbria County Council.

Mealsgate does not have its own parish council, instead it is part of Allhallows Parish Council. The Parish of Allhallows incorporates the three villages of Baggrow, Fletchertown and Watch Hill, together with the area of Mealsgate known as Pine Grove.

Landmarks
Around  to the south-west is Whitehall, a medieval tower house, restored by Anthony Salvin in the 19th century.

See also

Listed buildings in Allhallows, Cumbria

References

External links

 Cumbria County History Trust: Boltons (nb: provisional research only – see Talk page)
 Mealsgate - The George Moore Connection

Villages in Cumbria
Allerdale